Obojeni program (Colored Program) is the debut compilation album by the Serbian indie/alternative rock band Obojeni Program released by the Serbian independent record label Music YUser in 1993, and consists of the material from the first two studio albums, Najvažnije je biti zdrav and Ovaj zid stoji krivo released in 1990 and 1991. The compilation was reissued in 1996 by Tarcus records and remastered and reissued in 2011 by Odličan Hrčak.

Track listing 
All lyrics and music by Obojeni Program.

Notes 
 Tracks 1-11 taken from Najvažnije je biti zdrav
 Tracks 12-21 taken from Ovaj zid stoji krivo
 Track 22 is a version of track 17 without the guitars and bass

References 

 Obojeni program at Discogs
 EX YU ROCK enciklopedija 1960-2006, Janjatović Petar; 
 NS rockopedija, novosadska rock scena 1963-2003, Mijatović Bogomir, SWITCH, 2005

Obojeni Program albums
1993 compilation albums